Nellie Sengupta (née Edith Ellen Gray; 12 January 1884 – 23 October 1973) was an Englishwoman who fought for Indian Independence. She was the first woman Alderman for Calcutta and was elected president of the Indian National Congress at its 48th annual session at Calcutta in 1933.

Family
Edith was the daughter of Frederick and Edith Henrietta Gray. She was born and brought up in Cambridge, where her father worked at a club. As a young girl, she fell in love with Jatindra Mohan Sengupta, a young Bengali student at Downing College who lodged at her parental home. Despite parental opposition, she married Jatindra Mohan and returned to Calcutta with him. Nellie, as she became known, and Jatin had two sons Sishir and Anil.

Non-Cooperation Movement

On returning to India, Nellie's husband Jatindra Mohan started a very successful career as a lawyer in Calcutta. In 1921 Jatindra Mohan joined the Indian freedom struggle and was Mahatma Gandhi's right-hand man in Bengal apart from being the Mayor of Calcutta for three terms and the head of the Legislative Assembly. Nellie joined her husband in participating in the Non-Cooperation Movement of 1921. After his imprisonment during the Assam-Bengal Railwaymen's strike, she forcefully protested against the District authorities imposition of a ban on assembly, addressed mass meetings and courted arrest. She defied the law by selling Khadi (hand-spun cloth) door to door. In 1931 she suffered four months' imprisonment at Delhi for addressing an unlawful assembly. Jatin was imprisoned in Ranchi and died in 1933.

Congress president
During the turmoil of the Salt Satyagraha many senior Congress leaders were imprisoned. Pandit Madan Mohan Malviya the President elect of the Congress was arrested before the Calcutta Session of 1933. Nellie Sengupta was elected in his place, thus becoming the third woman, and the second European-born woman to be elected. She was elected president by the party for her contribution to the party and the country.

She was also elected as an Alderman to the Calcutta Corporation in 1933 and 1936. She was also elected on a Congress ticket to the Bengal Legislative Assembly in 1940 and 1946. During the Second World War she drew attention to the misbehaviour of foreign troops.

Post-independence
After independence, she chose to live in East Pakistan, in her husband's hometown of Chittagong on the specific request of the then Indian Prime Minister Jawaharlal Nehru who asked her to look after the interests of the Hindu minority in East Pakistan. She was elected unopposed to the East Pakistan Legislative Assembly in 1954. She was a member of the Minority Board and remained an active social activist. When Bangladesh came into being in 1971 she continued to live on in Chittagong and was well cared for by the Bangladesh Prime Minister Sheikh Mujibur Rahman. In 1972 she broke her hip and through the intervention of Indira Gandhi she was brought to Calcutta where she was operated on and all medical expenses were paid for by the Indian government. She was accorded a tremendous welcome in Calcutta and honoured by both the government and the people for her contribution to both the Indian Freedom struggle along with her husband Deshapriya Jatindra Mohan Sengupta and her work for the minorities in Bangladesh. She died in Calcutta in 1973.

Awards
 Padma Vibhushan, 1973

References

Presidents of the Indian National Congress
Recipients of the Padma Vibhushan in social work
1880s births
1973 deaths
British people in colonial India
Politicians from Kolkata
Indian National Congress politicians from West Bengal
Social workers from West Bengal
Social workers
Women in West Bengal politics
Women educators from West Bengal
Educators from West Bengal
19th-century British women
20th-century Indian women politicians
20th-century Indian politicians